The 2020 Denver Outlaws season was the 15th and final season for the Outlaws in Major League Lacrosse. The Outlaws were coming off of another championship loss after going 9–7 in the previous year and were looking to bounce back for their fourth Steinfeld Cup title. They would only go 4–1 on the season due to the COVID–19 pandemic. They would make the playoffs again but would lose to the Boston Cannons in the title game by a 13–10 score.

Shortened season

The Outlaws along with the other five remaining teams were originally slated to play a ten-game regular season that was originally scheduled to begin on May 30. However, due to the rising number of COVID-19 cases, the league suspended the season until July 18. The 2020 season ended up being a five-game regular season and all games including the playoffs were played at Navy–Marine Corps Memorial Stadium, home of the Chesapeake Bayhawks.

Regular season

Schedule

Postseason
The playoffs originally included the Connecticut Hammerheads facing the Chesapeake Bayhawks while the Outlaws face the Boston Cannons in the semifinals. However, a player exhibited COVID–19 symptoms and was placed on quarantine. Later, he tested positive and would put the Bayhawks and Hammerheads in quarantine. Both teams forfeited from the playoffs and the Cannons and Outlaws would square off in the championship game on July 26 instead. The Cannons won their second Steinfeld Cup over the Outlaws by a 13–10 score.

Standings

References

External links
 Team Website 

Major League Lacrosse seasons
Denver Outlaws